Acacia retrorsa is a shrub of the genus Acacia and the subgenus Phyllodineae that is endemic to western Australia

Description
The multistemmed shrub has quite slender branches with a length of up to  It has glabrous or slightly hairy, green coloured branchlets that have fine yellow-coloured ribbing. Like most species of Acacia it has phyllodes rather than true leaves. The sessile and evergreen phyllodes are pointing backwards. It blooms from August to September and produces yellow flowers. The inflorescences occur on single headed racemes and have spherical flower-heads containing 16 to 24 light golden coloured flowers.

Taxonomy
The species was first formally described by the botanist Carl Meissner in 1855 as part of the work Botanische Zeitung . It was reclassified as Racosperma retrorsum by Leslie Pedley in 2003 then transferred back to genus Acacia in 2006.
It is thought to be allied to the Acacia pravifolia group and superficially resembles Acaca declinata.

Distribution
It is native to an area in the Wheatbelt and Mid West regions of Western Australia where it is found growing in gravelly, sandy or loamy soils over or around laterite. It has a very limited range between Jurien Bay in the north down to around Eneabba in the south where it is usually as a part of low open woodland or low open heathland communities.

See also
 List of Acacia species

References

retrorsa
Acacias of Western Australia
Taxa named by Carl Meissner
Plants described in 1855